{{Infobox newspaper
| name                 = Nash Put'
| logo                 = 
| image                = Nash Put newspaper.jpg
| image_size           = 200px
| caption              = The November 7, 1935, front page ofNash Put| type                 = Daily newspaper
| format               = Broadsheet
| owners               = 
| founder              = 
| publisher            = V.N. Vasilenko, G.A. Khoven
| editor               =  Konstantin Rodzaevsky
| foundation           = October 3, 1933
| political            = Fascist
| language             = Russian language
| ceased publication   = July 1, 1943
| headquarters         = Harbin (Manchukuo),  Shanghai (China)
| circulation          = 4,000
}}Nash Put''' (Our Way) was a daily newspaper founded by Konstantin Rodzaevsky on 3 October 1933, that was issued in Harbin (1933–41) and Shanghai (1941-1943). The newspaper was the official organ of the Russian Fascist Party. Nash Put was published until July 1943. The newspaper promoted Christian Orthodoxy, Russian ultranationalism and fascism. Estimated circulation was 4,000. The paper was edited by Konstantin Rodzaevsky from 1933 to 1943. There was also a publishing house, "Izdatel'stvo gazety Nash Put" ("Publisher of the newspaper Our Way"). In 1936 it published Vladimir Kislitsin's memoirs In the fires of the Civil War: Memoires.

It is the source for an alleged quote from Leon Trotsky whose source claims to be from the memoirs of Aron Simanovitch, Rasputin's secretary.

References

SourcesThe Russian Fascists: Tragedy and Farce in Exile, 1925-1945 by John J. Stephan 
К. В. Родзаевский. Завещание Русского фашиста''. М., ФЭРИ-В, 2001 
Knútr Benoit: Konstantin Rodzaevsky. Dict, 2012,

External links
Наш путь (Харбин, 1933–1938)
Наш путь (Шанхай, 1941–1943)

1933 establishments in China
1939 disestablishments in China
Defunct newspapers published in China
Eastern Orthodoxy and far-right politics
Fascist newspapers and magazines
Newspapers published in Harbin
Newspapers published in Shanghai
Publications disestablished in 1939
Publications established in 1933
Russian diaspora in China
Russian Fascist Party
Russian-language newspapers
Russian nationalism